Maddux is an English surname.  It is a variant of Maddox.  Notable people with the surname include:

Don Maddux (born 1940), American politician from Ohio
Greg Maddux (born 1966), American baseball pitcher and member of the Baseball Hall of Fame, brother of Mike Maddux
Jared Maddux (1911–1971), American politician from Tennessee
Masha Dashkina Maddux, Ukrainian dancer
Mike Maddux (born 1961), American baseball pitcher and current pitching coach for the St. Louis Cardinals, brother of Greg Maddux
Roger Maddux (born 1948), American professor and mathematician
Sam Maddux, Jr. (1915–1990), United States Air Force officer
Stu Maddux (born 1965), American writer and cinematographer

See also
Maddux (statistic), a baseball statistic named after Greg Maddux
Maddox (surname)
Maddox (disambiguation)
Maddux Airlines

English-language surnames